The Bengal tiger (Panthera tigris tigris) is a tiger subspecies.

The name Bengal tiger also refers to:

Film and television
Bengal Tiger (1936 film), an American English-language film
Bengal Tiger (2015 film), an Indian Telugu-language film
The Bengal Tiger (Minder episode), an episode of the TV series Minder

Other uses
Bengal Tiger or Bengal Tiger at the Baghdad Zoo, a stage production
Scuttlers, members of neighbourhood-based youth gangs of late-Victorian England
Canna 'Bengal Tiger', a cultivar of the canna plant
Tiger II, a German WW2 heavy tank nicknamed Königstiger (Bengal tiger)

See also
Bengal (disambiguation)
Tiger (disambiguation)
Royal Bengal Tigers (disambiguation)